Charlie Barnes (and variants) may refer to:

 Charlie Barnes (musician) (born 1989), English singer-songwriter
 Charlie Barnes (Australian footballer) (1903–1981), Australian rules footballer
 Charlie Barnes (baseball) (born 1995), American baseball pitcher
 Charley Barnes (born 1938), American football player
 Charles Barnes (1901–1998), Australian politician
 Charles Barnes (cricketer) (1882–1947), Australian cricketer
 Charles N. Barnes (1860–1932), American politician and lawyer
 Charles Reid Barnes (1858–1910), American botanist